Alexandra Irina Măruță ( Mihai; born 23 August 1986), better known by her stage name Andra, is a Romanian singer, songwriter and television personality. Andra began her career at the age of seven, where she had her first performance in TVR's musical competition Tip Top Minitop, singing "I Will Always Love You" by Whitney Houston. In 2001, at 14 years old, Andra released her first single, "În noapte mă trezesc" ("I Wake Up in the Night"). In both 2004 and 2007, she attempted to represent Romania at the Eurovision Song Contest with the songs "Just a Little Love" and "Dracula, My Love", respectively.

Since then, she has issued several hits, including the number ones "K la meteo" ("Like the Weather Forecast"; 2012), "Inevitabil va fi bine" ("It Will Inevitably Be Fine"; 2013), "Avioane de hârtie" ("Paper Airplanes"; 2015), "Niciodată să nu spui niciodată" ("Never Say Never"; 2015) and "Jumătatea mea mai bună" ("My Better Half"; 2021). Andra's 2007 album De la frate la soră (From Brother to Sister) with Mihai Săndel has notably been certified diamond in Romania for sales of 60,000 copies. In 2013, the singer was nominated for Best Romanian Act at the MTV Europe Music Awards, and went on to win the award in 2014 and in 2016. Andra's work on national television include presenting the shows Singuri cu vedeta (Alone with the Celebrity) on Antena 1 and O-la-la on Pro TV, as well as being a judge on Românii au talent and Vocea României.

Discography

Albums

Studio albums

Other albums

Compilation albums

Extended plays

Singles

As lead artist

As featured artist

Promotional singles

Guest appearances

Notes

External links

 Official website

References

1986 births
Living people
21st-century Romanian singers
21st-century Romanian women singers
Romanian dance musicians
Romanian women pop singers
Romanian television personalities
People from Câmpia Turzii